Elvira Sergeevna Tugusheva (born 14 August 1994 in Saratov, Russia), better known by her stage name Elvira T is a Russian singer and songwriter. After the success of Elvira T's YouTube song "Всё решено" (Vsyo Resheno, "All is Decided") when she was 15, she quickly rose to fame with the song hitting the top 20 charts in Russia, and coming into the top 100 of Europe.

She later moved from Saratov to Moscow, enrolling in MGUKI where she continued to write songs.

References

1994 births
Living people
Russian pop singers
21st-century Russian singers
Volga Tatar people